Dilys Bennett Laing (1906 in North Wales – 1960) was an American poet.

Education
She was educated in England and Canada. She married Alexander Laing, a Dartmouth College graduate, and later professor, in 1936 and became an American citizen.  They had one son.

Career
She was a writer, poet, and artist. She was admired by such contemporary poets as Robert Lowell. She died in 1960.

She was included in the Norton Anthology of Literature by Women.

Her papers are held at Dartmouth College.

Bibliography

Journal contributions
 Growl Scares Dog, Good Housekeeping, New York, January, 1942
 Nautilus, Poetry Magazine, Volume 60, April 1942, Page 23
 To A Mathematician, June 13, 1942, The New Yorker, June 13, 1942, p. 17
 Eros Out of the Sea, Poetry Magazine, Volume 64, June 1944, Page 137
 2 Poems, Yale Review Winter 1944
 That time of year, Harper's Magazine, January 1943, p.168
 Occult Adventure, Poetry Magazine, Volume 65, January 1945, Page 191
 Genesis and Exodus, Poetry Magazine, Volume 68, April 1946, Page 11
 Root and Branch, Poetry Magazine, Volume 68, April 1946, Page 11
 The Bell, Poetry Magazine, Volume 68, April 1946, Page 11
 Proof and Reproof, Yale Review, Summer 1946 
 Men at Work, Harper's Magazine, January 1948, p.38
 Love has so Terrible a Face, Yale Review Autumn 1947
 Rescue, Poetry Magazine, Volume 72, May 1948, Page 74
 The Uncreation, Poetry Magazine, Volume 72, May 1948, Page 74
 Welcome Song, Poetry Magazine, Volume 72, May 1948, Page 74
 Harsh Return, Poetry Magazine, Volume 75, March 1950, Page 332
 Time Is All a Year, Poetry Magazine, Volume 79, March 1952, Page 321
 The Proud, Poetry Magazine, Volume 79, March 1952, Page 321
 To Dolores Preserved, Poetry Magazine, Volume 79, March 1952, Page 321
 Dance of Burros, Poetry Magazine, Volume 81, December 1952, Page 174
 Afternoon of a Forethinker, Poetry Magazine, Volume 82, May 1953, Page 72
 Capsule Dragon, Poetry Magazine, Volume 82, August 1953, Page 255
 Saint Giotto of Assisi, Poetry Magazine, Volume 83, February 1954, Page 256
 I Shall Know, Poetry Magazine, Volume 83, February 1954, Page 256
 The Catch, Poetry Magazine, Volume 85, October 1954, Page 13
 Profan Witness, The Beloit Poetry Journal, Fall 1955
 Let Them Ask Their Husbands, The Nation, January 4, 1958
 I Attend a Reception for a Visiting Celebrity, The Nation, May 24, 1958
 Walled City, The Nation, December 27, 1958
 Don't Tread on Us, The Nation,  January 31, 1959
 The Compassionate Torturers, The Nation, April 23, 1960
 Threnody on the Demise of As and Now, The Nation, March 19, 1960
 The Dazzled Ones, The Nation,  December 17, 1960
 The City and the Song, The Nation, February 25, 1961
 Picasso's Candlefire, Poetry Magazine, Volume 97, March 1961, Page 362
 The Swift Ships, Poetry Magazine, Volume 97, March 1961, Page 362
 Poems from a Cage, Poetry Magazine, Volume 101, December 1962, Page 209
 Maintenant, The Nation,  July 27, 1963
 The Power, The Nation,  August 24, 1963
 Flowers out of Rock, Poetry Magazine, Volume 104, April 1964, Page 14

Books

Reviews
 Our Life in Poetry: Selected Essays and Reviews, M. L. Rosenthal, Persea Books (May 1991),

References

External links
Poetry Magazine: The Historical Index
Dilys Laing Papers at Dartmouth Collection

1906 births
1960 deaths
20th-century American poets
American women poets
20th-century American women writers
British expatriates in Canada
British emigrants to the United States